The 2006–07 QMJHL season was the 38th season in the history of the Quebec Major Junior Hockey League. The regular season ran from September 14, 2006 to March 18, 2007. Eighteen teams played 70 games each in the schedule. The Lewiston Maineiacs finished first overall in the regular season winning their first Jean Rougeau Trophy. Lewiston won 16 playoff games, losing only one, en route to their first President's Cup, defeating the Val-d'Or Foreurs in the finals.

Final standings
Note: GP = Games played; W = Wins; L = Losses; OTL = Overtime loss; SL = Shootout loss; PTS = Points; GF = Goals for; GA = Goals against

complete list of standings.

Scoring leaders
Note: GP = Games played; G = Goals; A = Assists; Pts = Points; PIM = Penalty minutes

 complete scoring statistics

Goaltending leaders
Note: GP = Games played; Mins = Minutes Played; W = Wins; L = Losses: OTL = Overtime losses; SL = Shootout losses; GA = Goals allowed; SO = Shutouts; GAA = Goals against average

Canada-Russia Challenge
The 2006 ADT Canada-Russia Challenge was hosted by the Rouyn-Noranda Huskies and the Val-d'Or Foreurs. On November 20, 2006, the QMJHL All-stars defeated the Russian Selects 6–2 at the Aréna Dave Keon. On November 21, 2006, the QMJHL All-stars defeated the Russian Selects 4–3 at the Centre Air Creebec. Since the tournament began in 2003, the QMJHL All-stars have won five games, the Russian Selects have three wins.

Playoffs
The top nine teams from the Telus division, and top seven teams from the Eastern division qualified for the playoffs. The ninth place team in the Telus division qualified in the Eastern division, and ranked by regular season points. All series were best-of-seven. Divisions crossed over in the semifinals.

Brad Marchand was the leading scorer of the playoffs with 40 points (16 goals, 24 assists).

†Shawinigan seeded 8th in Eastern division.

All-star teams
First team
 Goaltender - Ondrej Pavelec, Cape Breton Screaming Eagles 
 Left defence - Andrew MacDonald, Moncton Wildcats 
 Right defence - Kris Letang, Val-d'Or Foreurs 
 Left winger - Vyacheslav Trukhno, Gatineau Olympiques 
 Centreman - Mathieu Perreault, Acadie-Bathurst Titan 
 Right winger - Thomas Beauregard, Acadie-Bathurst Titan

Second team  
 Goaltender - Jonathan Bernier, Lewiston Maineiacs 
 Left defence - Oskars Bartulis, Cape Breton Screaming Eagles 
 Right defence - Jean-Claude Sawyer, Cape Breton Screaming Eagles 
 Left winger - Benoît Doucet, Victoriaville Tigres 
 Centreman - James Sheppard, Cape Breton Screaming Eagles
 Right winger - François Bouchard, Baie-Comeau Drakkar

Rookie team 
 Goaltender - Peter Delmas, Lewiston Maineiacs 
 Left defence - Mark Barberio, Cape Breton Screaming Eagles / Moncton Wildcats
 Right defence - Simon Lacroix, Shawinigan Cataractes 
 Left winger - Michael Frolik, Rimouski Océanic 
 Centreman - Christopher DiDomenico, Saint John Sea Dogs 
 Right winger - Jakub Voracek, Halifax Mooseheads 
 List of First/Second/Rookie team all-stars.

Trophies and awards
Team
President's Cup - Playoff Champions, Lewiston Maineiacs
Jean Rougeau Trophy - Regular Season Champions, Lewiston Maineiacs
Luc Robitaille Trophy - Team that scored the most goals, Cape Breton Screaming Eagles
Robert Lebel Trophy - Team with best GAA, Lewiston Maineiacs

Player
Michel Brière Memorial Trophy - Most Valuable Player, Mathieu Perreault, Acadie-Bathurst Titan
Jean Béliveau Trophy - Top Scorer, François Bouchard, Baie-Comeau Drakkar
Guy Lafleur Trophy - Playoff MVP, Jonathan Bernier, Lewiston Maineiacs    
Telus Cup – Offensive - Offensive Player of the Year 
Telus Cup – Defensive - Defensive Player of the Year
Jacques Plante Memorial Trophy - Best GAA, Ondrej Pavelec, Cape Breton Screaming Eagles
Guy Carbonneau Trophy - Best Defensive Forward, Marc-André Cliche - Lewiston Maineiacs
Emile Bouchard Trophy - Defenceman of the Year, Kris Letang, Val-d'Or Foreurs
Kevin Lowe Trophy - Best Defensive Defenceman, Kris Letang, Val-d'Or Foreurs   
Mike Bossy Trophy - Best Pro Prospect, Angelo Esposito, Quebec Remparts
RDS Cup - Rookie of the Year, Jakub Voracek, Halifax Mooseheads
Michel Bergeron Trophy - Offensive Rookie of the Year, Jakub Voracek, Halifax Mooseheads
Raymond Lagacé Trophy - Defensive Rookie of the Year, T. J. Brennan, St. John's Fog Devils
Frank J. Selke Memorial Trophy - Most sportsmanlike player, David Desharnais, Chicoutimi Saguenéens
QMJHL Humanitarian of the Year - Humanitarian of the Year, Roger Kennedy, Halifax Mooseheads
Marcel Robert Trophy - Best Scholastic Player, Alexandre Picard-Hooper, Baie-Comeau Drakkar
Paul Dumont Trophy - Personality of the Year, Kris Letang, Val-d'Or Foreurs

Executive
Ron Lapointe Trophy - Coach of the Year, Clément Jodoin, Lewiston Maineiacs 
Maurice Filion Trophy - General Manager of the Year, Pascal Vincent, Cape Breton Screaming Eagles
John Horman Trophy - Executive of the Year, Pierre Dufour, Val D'Or Foreurs
Jean Sawyer Trophy - Marketing Director of the Year, Nadia Lacasse & Mélanie Allard, Rouyn-Noranda Huskies

See also
2007 Memorial Cup
2007 NHL Entry Draft
2006–07 OHL season
2006–07 WHL season

References
 Official QMJHL Website
 www.hockeydb.com/

Quebec Major Junior Hockey League seasons
QMJHL